Podocarpus lambertii is a species of conifer in the family Podocarpaceae. It is found in Argentina and Brazil.

References

lambertii
Near threatened plants
Taxonomy articles created by Polbot